Armand Bazié (born March 20, 1992), is an Ivorian professional footballer who plays as a midfielder for Abu Salem in the Libyan Premier League.

Career
Known for his dogged displays in the middle of the park, Bazié began his career in India with Rainbow AC in 2017–18 Calcutta Premier Division. His good performance in the CFL caught the attention of East Bengal officials, and he was signed by East Bengal ahead of the 2017-18 I-League season.

For some problems (salary), East Bengal released Bazié in January 2018, after losing twice against arch-rivals Mohun Bagan in I-League. However, it did not take long for Bazié to find a new home, as he was scouted by Minerva Punjab, with whom he eventually won the title.

After a fruitful short stint with Minerva Punjab, he returned to Kolkata and joined Mohammedan Sporting for the 2018–19 CFL.

In September 2018, Bazie signed with newly promoted I-League club Real Kashmir F.C. where he has played almost all matches in 2018–19 season and scored 6goals. His brilliant performance in season 2018–19 season earned him a contract for season 2019–20.

On 20 October 2020, Bazie signed with Goan team Churchill Brothers for 2020–21 season of I-League. Bazie was named captain of the team for entire season and Churchill Brothers finished runner up in I-League.

In April 2021, Bazie was signed by a Libyan Premier League team Abu Salem for second half of the season.

Personal life
His brother, Kamo Stephane Bayi, is also a professional footballer. Both of them started their professional career in India.

Career statistics

Club

Honours
Minerva Punjab
I-League: 2017–18
Churchill Brothers
I-League: 2020–21

References

External links
Bazie Armand at Eurosport

1992 births
Living people
Ivorian footballers
Real Kashmir FC players
I-League players
Association football midfielders
Calcutta Football League players